Spinneret is a science fiction novel by American writer Timothy Zahn. It was published in 1985.

Plot summary

The novel is set on year 2016 Earth, with several interstellar ships being launched by the US and the EU in the hopes of finding habitable worlds to alleviate the overpopulation of Earth, only to find that while inhabitable worlds exists aplenty, they are all taken by a Commonwealth of alien races. This device allows the author to explain why his colonists are sent to the one world available, devoid of any life form because of its unexplainable lack of metals.

Zahn describes briefly the conflicts between the military and civilian parts of the Astra expedition, the latter further divided between scientists and colonists, then introduces the main device of the novel – the planet itself somehow absorbs the metal, leading to equipment literally vanishing into the ground. Soon after the disappearance, what was thought to be a dormant volcano launches into orbit a cable of an unknown material, which turns out to be superconductive, of great tensile strength and with the ability to atomically bond with anything it touches. From this fact the author derives the novel's title: Astra is actually the "Spinneret" of this cable. What once was a resource-less dirtball soon becomes the most popular factory in the galaxy, with several alien races, the UN and the United States all jockeying for rights to the cable, with the colonists stuck in between. Looming over this tableau lies the question of who the Spinners were – or are, why they disappeared, and what they could have used such huge amounts of cable for.

In the final chapters, an Astra expedition on a newly recovered Spinner craft discovers the Spinner world – englobed in a Dyson sphere of Cable material, designed to project the same spectrum of a red giant. The scientists conclude that the Spinners, involved in a war with some other now-extinct race, had decided to disguise their home star in the unsuccessful attempt not to be found and destroyed. The Spinners' world becomes the new Earth population outlet, with the proceedings of Cable sales bootstrapping its economy.

The alien races depicted by Timothy Zahn are the ctencri, shrewd merchants not unlike Star Trek'''s Ferengi; the rooshrike with their warrior code of honour; the m'zarch, a foolhardy race bent on war for war's sake, reminiscent of Klingons; the pom, a marine race resembling dolphins; the orspham; and the whissst, a race whose whole culture is based upon humour and practical jokes.

Publication history
The novel was previously serialized in 4 issues of the magazine Analog'' (July–October 1985), illustrated by Douglas L. Beekman.

References

Novels by Timothy Zahn
1985 American novels
American science fiction novels
Fiction set in 2016